WLGM-LP (93.9 FM) is a radio station broadcasting a Religious music format. Licensed to Edgewater, Florida, United States, the station is currently owned by Edgewater Alliance Church.

References

External links
 

LGM-LP
LGM-LP
Radio stations established in 2014
2014 establishments in Florida